Project Row Houses is a development in the Third Ward area of Houston, Texas. Project Row Houses includes a group of shotgun houses restored in the 1990s. Eight houses serve as studios for visiting artists. Those houses are art studios for art related to African-American themes. A row behind the art studio houses single mothers.

History 
Rick Lowe, a native of Alabama and 2014 MacArthur "genius" grant winner, founded Project Row Houses in 1993 with James Bettison, Bert Long, Jr., Jesse Lott, Floyd Newsum, Bert Samples, and George Smith. In 1990, according to Lowe, a group of high school students approached Lowe and asked him to create solutions to problems instead of creating works that tell the community about issues it is already aware of. Lowe and a coalition of artists purchased a group of 22 shotgun houses across two blocks that were built in 1930 and, by the 1990s, were in poor condition. Lisa Gray of the Houston Chronicle said that the houses, originally used as rentals, were "previously ruled by drugs and prostitutes."

Inspired by the work of John T. Biggers, the group used seed money funds from the Elizabeth Firestone Graham Foundation and the National Endowment for the Arts to restore the houses. Corporate sponsor Chevron renovated the outside of several shotgun houses. The director of the Menil Foundation allowed Monday to be a day off of work for the employees so that they could help renovate the shotgun houses. Volunteers numbering in the hundreds fortified porches, removed trash and used needles from lots, and hung wallboard. Several individuals and families from the area and one local church "adopted" individual houses. Garnet Coleman adopted one house. The houses first opened in 1994.

Deborah Grotfeldt created the concept of the Young Mothers Residential Program, which began operations in 1996; Grotfeldt had worked with Lowe since the Project Row Houses project started. The program gives single mothers one year of housing to allow them to finish their education and organize themselves. Michael Kimmelman of The New York Times said "It has been as successful as the artist residency program."

As of 2009 the Project Row Houses campus had 40 properties. As of that year, some houses have art exhibitions and some houses provide housing space for resident artists. Newer low income housing blocks, using designs provided by the Rice Building Workshop, are now a part of the campus. The program for young mothers uses seven shotgun houses. A playground is adjacent to those houses. In addition, several shotgun houses built in the Victorian era, moved there earlier from historically black communities under development, are a part of the campus. The Eldorado Ballroom and the Bert Long sculpture "Field of Vision" are a part of the campus. Lisa Gray of the Houston Chronicle said during that year "Driving around, this writer found it's hard to tell where the Row Houses campus begins and ends."

Resident alumni of Artist Rounds 

 Terry Adkins
 Edgar Arceneaux
 Michelle Barnes
 William Cordova
 Aisha Cousins
 Erika DeFreitas
 Brendan Fernandes
 Coco Fusco
 Charles Gaines
 Leslie Hewitt
 Ayana Jackson
 Ayanna Jolivet McCloud
 Rodney McMillian
 Charles Huntley Nelson
 Mendi & Keith Obadike
 Lovie Olivia
 Robert Pruitt
 Kameelah Janan Rasheed
 Martine Syms
 Tatyana Fazlalizadeh
 Autumn Knight
 Otobong Nkanga
 Tricia Ward
 Question Bridge: Black Males ( Chris Johnson, Bayete Ross Smith, Hank Willis Thomas and Kamal Sinclair)
 In-Situ William Titley, Kerry Morrison, and Paul Hartley

Funding 
In 2006, the Houston City Council gave Project Row Houses a grant of $975,000.

Honors 
 1997: Rudy Bruner Award for Urban Excellence silver medal

Education
Children living in the houses attend schools in the Houston Independent School District. Zoned schools include Blackshear Elementary School, Cullen Middle School, and Yates High School. Students were previously zoned to Ryan Middle School before 2013; students were reassigned to Cullen after it closed. Beginning in 2018 the magnet middle school Baylor College of Medicine Academy at Ryan also serves as a boundary option for students zoned to Blackshear, Lockhart, and MacGregor elementary schools.

References

Further reading
 
 
  
 
 Sewing, Joy. "Project Row Houses melds art and community in the Third Ward." Houston Chronicle. Friday, May 27, 2016.

External links

 Project Row Houses
 Third Ward TX – documentary on Project Row Houses

Webarchive template wayback links
Houses in Houston
African-American culture
Third Ward, Houston